Haute-Corrèze Communauté is a communauté de communes, an intercommunal structure, in the Corrèze and Creuse departments, in the Nouvelle-Aquitaine region, central France. It was created in January 2017 by the merger of the former communautés de communes Ussel - Meymac - Haute-Corrèze, Pays d'Eygurande, Gorges de la Haute-Dordogne, Val et Plateaux Bortois, Sources de la Creuse and part of Bugeat - Sornac - Millevaches au Cœur. Its area is 1815.6 km2, and its population was 33,330 in 2018. Its seat is in Ussel.

Communes
The communauté de communes consists of the following 71 communes, of which 11 in the Creuse department:

Corrèze:

Aix
Alleyrat
Ambrugeat
Bellechassagne
Bort-les-Orgues
Bugeat
Chavanac
Chaveroche
Chirac-Bellevue
Combressol
Confolent-Port-Dieu
Couffy-sur-Sarsonne
Courteix
Davignac
Eygurande
Feyt
Lamazière-Basse
Lamazière-Haute
Laroche-près-Feyt
Latronche
Liginiac
Lignareix
Margerides
Maussac
Merlines
Mestes
Meymac
Millevaches
Monestier-Merlines
Monestier-Port-Dieu
Neuvic
Palisse
Pérols-sur-Vézère
Peyrelevade
Roche-le-Peyroux
Saint-Angel
Saint-Bonnet-près-Bort
Sainte-Marie-Lapanouze
Saint-Étienne-aux-Clos
Saint-Étienne-la-Geneste
Saint-Exupéry-les-Roches
Saint-Fréjoux
Saint-Germain-Lavolps
Saint-Hilaire-Luc
Saint-Merd-les-Oussines
Saint-Pantaléon-de-Lapleau
Saint-Pardoux-le-Neuf
Saint-Pardoux-le-Vieux
Saint-Rémy
Saint-Setiers
Saint-Sulpice-les-Bois
Saint-Victour
Sarroux-Saint Julien
Sérandon
Sornac
Soursac
Thalamy
Ussel
Valiergues
Veyrières

Creuse:

Beissat
Clairavaux
La Courtine
Féniers
Magnat-l'Étrange
Malleret
Le Mas-d'Artige
Poussanges
Saint-Martial-le-Vieux
Saint-Merd-la-Breuille
Saint-Oradoux-de-Chirouze

References

Intercommunalities of Corrèze
Intercommunalities of Creuse
Commune communities in France